Petr Baron (born 28 November 1980) is a financier, banker, businessman.

Education

1994–1999 – Taunton School, UK. Academic qualification of GCSE, A-levels. Captain of rugby school team, School colours.

1999–2002 – City University (Cass Business School), UK. BSc Investment and Financial Risk Management. Graduated with high grade.

Career
In 2001 – real estate consultant in “Cushman & Wakefield Stiles & Riabokobylko”.

2002–2003 – advisor to the chairman of the supervisory board of Banking Group OVK, Moscow (at that time largest retail branch network after Sberbank). Participated in the sale of OVK to Rosbank. 

2002–2004 – member of  the supervisory board of International Private Bank, Macedonia.

2003–2005 – investment consultant (Eastern Europe) of Countryside Group Investments Ltd. (Essex, Great Britain). Supervised real estate transactions, participated in creation of one of the largest residential real estate portfolio.

2005–2006 – investment director of John Galt Investments (TVR Motors), Great Britain.

2006–2008 – member of the supervisory board and during 2006–2007 - first vice-president of VABank (Kyiv, Ukraine), member of TBIF Financial Services. Later on bank launched rebranding and changed its brand name to VAB Bank.

2007–2008 – CEO and chairman of VAB Group (Kyiv, Ukraine) – large financial group providing wide range of commercial services, comprising nine companies: VAB Bank, VAB Insurance, VAB Life, VAB Leasing, VAB Pension, VAB Express, VAB Re, VAB Asset Management, VAB Capital.

In May 2008, as a result of restructuring of VAB Group, Petr was appointed CEO and chairman of the management board of VAB Bank – cross functional commercial bank with foreign investments, 180 branches, 500 POS locations and 2800 employees across the country.

In 2010, under his management VAB Bank launched new business strategy with the view to refocus bank to retail business.

During January–May 2010 VAB Bank successfully restructured eurobonds for up to $125 million. At the end of 2010 bank returned NBU refinancing, attracted in 2009. At the beginning of 2011 VAB Bank paid off the bonds, placed in 2008, thus having paid domestic borrowings in full.
In November 2011, as a result of change of ownership of VAB Bank and discordance in opinions, having not supported either side, Petr Baron resigned.
2012-2016 – Vice-president strategy, TBIF Financial Services, leading provider of financial services in CEE, focused on retail banking, consumer finance, leasing and SME, also former majority stakeholder of VAB Bank. Advisory role to the Managing Director on group’s banking and non-bank financial services operations across CEE.

In partnership with Alfa-Bank Petr Baron launched MAXI Card program – the first coalition multi-branded loyalty program in Ukraine that runs on Visa payment system. MAXI comprised 50 major nationwide mass merchants from shopping, entertainment, food, healthcare and lifestyle sectors, with total number of cards reaching 2,7 mln in 2018.

From 2016 until present – CEO of TBIF Financial Services B.V. (TBI Bank), member of 4finance Group S.A.. TBI Bank is 100% owned by TBIF Financial Services B.V. and is fully licensed consumer and SME focused bank operating in Bulgaria and Romania through a partners’ network of more than 9500 sales points, 172 own locations and 146 branches, with over 1.04 million customer base across both countries. According to Capital annual ranking (2017), TBI Bank is named first in Stability and Risk category, also retaining its leading position on key Profitability indicators with the highest ranking in Profit Margin, Return on Assets and Return on Equity.

Between July 2017 and October 2019 Petr was also a Member of Executive Committee, 4finance Group S.A., taking all relevant decisions on managing the Group and its entities, overseeing and assessment of the Group’s entities’ performance, ensuring that robust risk management and compliance, as well as applicable governance systems, are established and maintained.

Hobbies

 Contemporary art collection – owner of one of the largest private collections of Ukrainian contemporary art; 
Boxing, running,

References
 From traditional to digital, Petr Baron on transforming TBI from bank to challenger.
 WHEN THE CUSTOMER TRULY BECOMES KING 
 TBI Bank will approve loans in Bulgaria entirely online in 9 minutes
 Bulgaria can only profit from the Euro 
 The Future of Banks is Borderless” 
 September cover of Bulgaria on Air’s magazin
 TBI Bank is successful because it is customer-focused”, anniversary edition of Banker Special for Banker Weekly newspaper Bulgaria 
 Forbes Bulgaria and Romania feature TBI Bank in their April issues
 ТBI Bank holds two №1 spots (Effectiveness and Profitability) in Bulgarian banks ranking 
 We want to be the first fintech Bulgarian Bank 
 TBI Bank shows again the best result in profitability among the Bulgarian banks
 Interview for BBC World Business Report
 Interview on situation in Ukraine for BBC World Business Edition
 VAB Bank — the iBank of Ukraine.
 Петр Барон, Председатель правления VAB Group: "Нам больше нравится 'ВиЭйБи', чем 'ВАБ'.
 Рейтинг 20 лучших банкиров Украины.
 Собирательные образы
 Петр Барон, VAB Банк: «Сейчас банки задумываются о качестве сервиса».
 Между банками и заемщиками идет откровенная война
 Председатель правления VAB банка Петр Барон рассказал о специфике отношений с заемщиками, не желающими платить по кредитам.
 Петр Барон: «Я никогда не буду делать то, что невыгодно».
 Украинские банки подписали Меморандум о сотрудничестве
 Иво Георгиев: «VAB имеет хорошую платформу для развития и потенциал, но сегодня банку важно не стать заложником конфликта акционеров».
 Куда уходят банкиры.

 Ukraine bankers cautious on IMF relief
 Куда уходят банкиры.
 

1980 births
Living people
Alumni of Bayes Business School